Hibbertia pungens is a species of flowering plant in the family Dilleniaceae and is endemic to Western Australia. It was first formally described in 1863 by George Bentham in Flora Australiensis. The specific epithet (pungens) means "ending in a sharp point".

This species is found in the Avon Wheatbelt, Coolgardie, Esperance Plains, Geraldton Sandplains, Great Victoria Desert, Hampton, Mallee, Murchison and Yalgoo biogeographic regions of Western Australia where it grows on rocky hillsides, plains and river banks.

See also
List of Hibbertia species

References

pungens
Flora of Western Australia
Plants described in 1863
Taxa named by George Bentham